Luís Ricardo Nascimento (born 24 September 1981) is a Brazilian handball player for Handebol Clube Taubaté and the Brazilian national team.

Achievements
Pan American Men's Club Handball Championship:
2014, 2015, 2016, 2018
South and Central American Men's Club Handball Championship:2019''

References

1981 births
Living people
Brazilian male handball players